Government College of Engineering, Tirunelveli, is a state-owned Engineering Institute located in the city of Tirunelveli in the state of Tamil Nadu. Tirunelveli is often referred as the 'Oxford of south India' due to the larger number of educational institutions present. It is affiliated to Anna University, Chennai and is an AICTE and BOTE approved educational institution in Tamil Nadu.  It was established in the year 1981.  The college is spread over an area of 23 hectares.  The institution offers five undergraduate and five postgraduate programs. The syllabus and curriculum has been structured by Anna University, Chennai.

Curriculum

The institute offers five undergraduate and five postgraduate programs.

Undergraduate courses include:
 Civil Engineering
 Computer Science and Engineering
 Electronics and Communication Engineering
 Electrical and Electronics Engineering
 Mechanical Engineering.

Postgraduate courses include:
 Computer Science and Engineering
 Engineering Design
 Power Electronics and Drives
 Structural Engineering
 Communication Systems

Departments
 Department of Civil Engineering
 Department of Computer Science and Engineering
 Department of Electrical and Electronics Engineering
 Department of Electronics and Communication Engineering
 Department of Mechanical Engineering
 Department of English
 Department of  Mathematics
 Department of Physics
 Department of Chemistry
 Department of Physical Education
 Department of Library Engineering

Achievements
The college has twice secured seventh in the rank list of 229 colleges released by Anna University after the announcement of semester results.

ISTE Students Chapter
ISTE students chapter was incepted in the year 1994. The chapter arranges lectures,
seminars, computer courses and conducts quiz events inviting connoisseurs.
Personality Development Programmes
Entrepreneurship Programmes
GATE Preparation Tests

Literary and Debating Society
A literary and debating society has taken shape under the auspices of the Department of English & Humanities.

Hostels
Nearly 1200 students are provided residential accommodation. Four hostels (MANIMUTHARU, VAIGAI, PORUNAI, KAUVERI.) cater to the needs of male students and female students are accommodated in three hostels (BHAVANI, AMARAVATHI, NARMADHA). All the hostels offer a central
gymnasium and a stadium for indoor and outdoor games.

Chemistry
Analytical and applied chemistry and forms an integral part of the first year curriculum led by Dr. Sophie Beulah. Some of the research equipment available are: B.O.D., Photo calorimeter, Water and soil analysis kit and Muffle furnace

Physics
Equipment available: mechanical shaker, Flash and fire point apparatus, Electronic weighing balance etc., Spectrophotometer, Spectrometer, Electron microscope, Sonometer, Deflection magnetometer,
Ultrasonic interferometer.

Rotaract Club of GCE 
The college has an active Rotaract Club which was installed by its parent club Rotary Club of Tinnevelly on 9 September 2008. Since its inception, the club actively organizing several awareness programs, Blood donation camps, etc. The club is also keenly involved in the college's placement training programs. It is conducting numerous mock interviews with the help of its parent club for the betterment of the college students.

National Service Scheme (NSS)
NSS was started with an aim of creating awareness among the student community. Blood donation camp, first aid awareness program, guest lectures on health, cleanliness are conducted periodically. Every year NSS camp is organized by the college in some rural areas for creating awareness among people.

Placement cell
The Placement cell aims at providing good placements to the student. Placement Representatives are selected from each department every year and coordinated together by the Placement Officer. A separate block for Placements is allocated in 2017 for the benefit of placement related activities.

Working Hours
Departments          :  9.10 a.m to 12.40 p.m & 1.30 p.m to 4.30 p.m
Library              :  10.00 a.m to 5.45 p.m
Office               :  10.00 a.m to 5.45 p.m
Part-time B.E Class  :  6.15 p.m to 9.15 p.m   
A five-day week is followed with exceptions as per the guidelines of Anna University.

See also

 List of Tamil Nadu Government's Educational Institutions
 List of Tamil Nadu Government's Engineering Colleges

References

External links
 

Engineering colleges in Tamil Nadu
Colleges affiliated to Anna University
Education in Tirunelveli
Educational institutions established in 1981
1981 establishments in Tamil Nadu